Acetylated lanolin alcohol (sometimes known as sheep alcohol, lanolin alcohol, or wool alcohol) is a non-drying organic compound produced from lanolin, the fat of wool shearings, which has been reacted with acetic acid and a small amount of lye. There are synthetic variants available; however, the animal-derived product has more anti-allergenic tendencies. Acetylated lanolin alcohol is used as an emollient, to soften skin, but is mildly comedogenic, with a rating of 0-2 out of 5. For this reason, those who are prone to whiteheads and blackheads should patch test before using on a large scale. Acetylated lanolin alcohol can also be inflammatory to those with wool or lanolin allergies, and should be avoided in such cases.

References

External links

Alcohols
Acetate esters